Southport is a constituency in Merseyside which has been represented in the House of Commons of the UK Parliament since 2017 by Damien Moore of the Conservative Party.

Boundaries

1885–1918: The Borough of Southport, the Sessional Division of Southport, and the parishes of Blundell, Great and Little Crosby, Ince, and Thornton.

1918–1983: The County Borough of Southport.

1983–present: The Metropolitan Borough of Sefton wards of Ainsdale, Birkdale, Cambridge, Dukes, Kew, Meols, and Norwood.

The constituency covers the whole town of Southport and the localities of Ainsdale, Birkdale, Blowick, Churchtown, Crossens, Highpark, Hillside, Kew, Marshside, Meols Cop, and Woodvale. It is bordered to the north by South Ribble, to the east by West Lancashire, and to the south by Sefton Central.

History

Prominent members
In the 19th century a notable representative was George Nathaniel Curzon, future Viceroy of India.

In the 20th century, outside politics, Edward Marshall Hall was a notable trial barrister (KC) and Sir John Fowler Leece Brunner was the son of the leading industrialist Sir John Tomlinson Brunner.

As a frontbencher, long-serving representative Robert Hudson was recognised at the time of World War II as a competent Minister of Agriculture and Fisheries in charge of that department, and was made, to give him a peerage, a viscount.

Political history 
The constituency has been a Liberal or Conservative seat throughout its history, and marginal for much of this, enabling it to change hands 11 times between the parties since it was created in 1885, having had nine Conservative MPs and eight Liberal or Liberal Democrat MPs in its history.

During the nadir of the Liberal Party (from the 1930s to the 1960s) the constituency became a safe Conservative seat, with absolute majorities from 1931 until 1970 inclusive.

Former Deputy Prime Minister John Prescott ran for Labour for the seat in 1966 and came in second place.

With the rise again of the Liberal Party in the early 1970s, election results proved to be close contests. The constituency changed hands in the 1987 general election, when it was taken by Ronnie Fearn of the Liberal Party for the SDP-Liberal Alliance (shortly before the two parties merged to form the Liberal Democrats). Fearn had contested the seat unsuccessfully for the Liberals throughout the 1970s.

Fearn lost the seat to the Conservatives' Matthew Banks at the 1992 election (one of the few Conservative gains at that election), only to regain it at the 1997 election. The Liberal Democrats held the seat (under John Pugh after Fearn stood down in 2001) until 2017.

In the 2016 referendum on the UK's membership of the European Union, the Metropolitan Borough of Sefton, of which the constituency is a part, voted to remain in the European Union by 51.9%. Given its demography, it is estimated that Southport voted to remain by 54%.

The seat was one of the eight Liberal Democrat seats that survived the national vote share collapse during the 2015 general election, despite a higher-than-average drop in the Liberal Democrats' vote share. Pugh opted not to seek re-election in the 2017 general election, in which election the seat returned to the Conservatives, the only seat the Tories gained from the Liberal Democrats in 2017 (aside from Richmond Park, which they had gained at a 2016 by-election). A resurgent Labour vote pushed the Liberal Democrats into third place for the first time since 1966 with the seat now becoming a Tory-Labour marginal. The seat is the only seat in Merseyside held by the Tories and the only seat in Merseyside to not be held by Labour.

Constituency profile
This is a generally affluent seaside town in the borough of Sefton which has not suffered from significant deprivation compared to its Lancashire counterpart Blackpool. Workless claimants (registered jobseekers) were in November 2012 close to the national average of 3.8%, at 4.0% of the population based on a statistical compilation by The Guardian. Southport is home to the notable Royal Birkdale Golf Club, and Ainsdale Beach is part of the Sefton Coast Site of Special Scientific Interest.

Members of Parliament

Elections

Elections in the 2010s

Elections in the 2000s

Elections in the 1990s

Elections in the 1980s

Elections in the 1970s

Elections in the 1960s

Elections in the 1950s

Elections in the 1940s

Elections in the 1930s

Elections in the 1920s

Elections in the 1910s

Elections in the 1900s

Elections in the 1890s

 Caused by Naylor-Leyland's death.

 Caused by Curzon's appointment as Viceroy and Governor-General of India.

Elections in the 1880s

See also
List of parliamentary constituencies in Merseyside

Notes

References

Sources
Election results, 1950 – 2005
F. W. S. Craig, British Parliamentary Election Results 1885 – 1918
F. W. S. Craig, British Parliamentary Election Results 1918 – 1949

Parliamentary constituencies in North West England
Politics of the Metropolitan Borough of Sefton
Southport
Constituencies of the Parliament of the United Kingdom established in 1885